Metropolitan College of New York (MCNY), formerly Audrey Cohen College, is a private college in New York City. MCNY is accredited by the Middle States Commission on Higher Education and consists of three schools: The Audrey Cohen School for Human Services and Education, the School for Public Affairs and Administration, and the School for Business.

History

The college was founded in 1964 by educational pioneer Audrey Cohen as the Women's Talent Corp. It was renamed the College for Human Services in 1970, when it was granted a charter by the New York State Board of Regents. In 1983, it started offering business programs and in 1988, it added its first graduate program: a Master of Administration (today a Master of Public Administration). In 1992, the college was renamed Audrey Cohen College in honor of its founder. It gained its current name, the Metropolitan College of New York, in 2002.

In 2012, the associates and bachelor's degree in Business Administration and all MBA programs were accredited by the Accreditation Council for Business Schools and Programs. In addition, 2012 marked the MCNY re-opening of the Bronx Extension Center, located at 529 Courtlandt Avenue. This offered students living in surrounding areas a convenient campus where they could attend classes.

In 2016, MCNY moved to new locations in the Financial District of Manhattan to 60 West Street and the Melrose area of the South Bronx at 463 East 149th Street.

Academics
The highest degrees offered are master's degrees. The college follows founder Audrey Cohen's Purpose-Centered Education philosophy.  In contrast to colleges and universities that organize the school year according to semesters, MCNY refers to each term as a "purpose".  Each term's purpose, or unifying theme, drives the coursework for the term, which includes a Constructive Action (CA). The Purpose determines the focus for the Constructive Action that students are required to plan, implement, and evaluate. That Action must relate to the semester’s Purpose and improve the lives of individuals and institutions outside the classroom. CAs are unique student projects that combine classroom study with research-fieldwork projects that integrate lessons learned in all of the term's courses with hands-on experience.

Campus

Metropolitan College of New York has two locations, the main campus, part of a building in lower Manhattan at 60 West Street, and a second campus, also part of a building, in the Bronx at 463 East 149th Street.

In 2016, the college moved into a new Manhattan campus, away from its previous rented space in Manhattan on Canal Street. MCNY purchased three floors of the commercial condominium at 40 Rector Street in Manhattan, with 110,000 square feet of space and an entrance at 60 West Street. MCNY purchased part of the first and the sixth, seventh and eighth floors of the 19-story building with a $68 million loan. The college also moved to a new Bronx campus at 463 East 149th Street. The new Bronx campus is a 26,000 square foot, part of a building, and has the capacity to serve approximately 500 students.

International field study
The MBA programs at MCNY have an international field study experience in their curricula and the experience is an inherent part of these curricula. This action-oriented experience is tailored to ensure that students have the opportunity to work collaboratively in a pan-cultural environment in which they are exposed to new cultures and given the opportunity to explore them. Students enrolled in the MBA programs (Media Management, Financial Services, Health Services and Risk Management or General Management) will participate in the trip based on their credits completed and academic progress.

The field study's goal is to immerse students in the global business environment and students participation are required as this is necessary to develop and apply the skills required to work effectively in the global economy.  As part of the required international practicum course, students will be afforded the opportunity to work in a consultative capacity with an operating enterprise to address one or more existing business challenges.

The intensive 10-day Study Abroad component is also a part of MCNY’s Emergency and Disaster Management MPA program. The action-oriented immersive experience—included with program tuition, is designed to ensure that students can work collaboratively in a pan-cultural environment and learn from their international peers. MCNY students have traveled to Turkey, Chile, Spain, and other countries during past study abroad trip. All scheduling depends on the agency or organization that the class is working with and what their class project entails. At the trip’s conclusion, students prepare a summary and a comprehensive written report. Work from the trip also is included in students final Constructive Action project.

References

Further reading
Grace G. Roosevelt, Creating a College That Works: Audrey Cohen and Metropolitan College of New York, SUNY Press, 2015.

External links

Official website

Educational institutions established in 2007
Universities and colleges in Manhattan
Universities and colleges in the Bronx
Universities and colleges in New York City
Tribeca
Private universities and colleges in New York City
2007 establishments in New York City